This is a list of programs broadcast by Global Reality Channel, a defunct Canadian English language Category B specialty channel owned by Shaw Media. The channel broadcast reality television series and related programming.

Past programming
The Apprentice (UK)
Are You Smarter Than a Canadian 5th Grader?
Big Brother
Big Brother After Dark
Bridezillas
Cake Walk
Canada Sings
Dinner Party Wars
Fear Factor
From the Ground Up
Hell's Kitchen
Hoarders
Intervention Canada
Kitchen Nightmares
The Last 10 Pounds Bootcamp
Mob Wives
Party Mamas
The Real Housewives of Atlanta
The Real Housewives of New Jersey
The Real Housewives of New York City
Reality Obsessed
Rehab at the Hard Rock
Restaurant Makeover
Survivor
Top Chef Canada
Tori & Dean: Home Sweet Hollywood
Total Wipeout
TV with TV's Jonathan Torrens
Wedding Wars
Wipeout Canada
X-Weighted

See also
 List of programs broadcast by Global
 Global Reality Channel
 Global Television Network

References

http://www.globalreality.com

Global Reality